Hendra Gunawan may refer to:

 Hendra Aprida Gunawan - Indonesian badminton player
 Hendra Gunawan (painter) - Indonesian painter
 Hendra Gunawan (magician) - Indonesian magician